The 2010 CAF Confederation Cup group stage matches took place between 13 August and 17 October 2010. 

The group stage featured 8 qualifiers from the CAF Confederation Cup playoffs.

At the completion of the group stage, the top two teams in each group advanced to play in the semifinals.

Groups

Group A

Group B

References

Group stage